Omar Bradley (1893–1981) was a U.S. Army general who became General of the Army in World War II. General Bradley may also refer to:

Alfred Eugene Bradley (1864–1922), U.S. Army brigadier general
John Jewsbury Bradley (1869–1948), U.S. Army brigadier general
Luther Prentice Bradley (1822–1910), Union brigadier general
Mark Edward Bradley (1907–1999), U.S. Air Force general